Toad in the hole is a pub game, involving throwing brass coins at a lead topped table with a hole in the middle. The game is a more refined version of the coin-throwing game pitch penny.

The game itself involves throwing four brass coins or "toads" from the same distance as a dart board, to a square toad table, made of wooden legs and with a lead surface. If a toad goes down the hole it scores two points, or if it lands on the top it scores one point. If it hits the back of the table, or falls off it is void, so a grand total of eight points per turn can be scored. Scoring is performed in darts fashion, playing from 31 down. The first competitor throws two toads, with their opponent then throwing three, and from then on they throw all four, until they reach scores of less than four, wherein only the number of toads equal to the required finishing score may be thrown. Like darts, players must finish exactly - scoring more results in the player being "bust".

At tournament level, participants play best of three, and best of five in the final.

The original league in the United Kingdom is based in East Sussex, and has three divisions, involving roughly 21 teams based in pubs around the county. There is also a major "international competition", run by the Lions Club in Lewes and held in that town every year. More recently, a Brighton & Hove league was set up in 2021, involving local pubs and venues.

International competition winners 

1995 Lewes Arms
1996 Lewes Arms
1997 Brack Mount
1998 Lewes Arms
1999 Lewes Working Men's Club
2000 CSBS
2001 Lewes Arms
2002 Swan Cygnets
2003 The Laughing Fish
2004 The Laughing Fish
2005 The Laughing Fish
2006 Old Azurians
2007 King's Head
2008 The Laughing Fish A
2009 The Laughing Fish B
2010 DCC
2011 DCC
2012 The Chalk Pit
2013 Old Azurians
2014 The Leek'y Boys
2015 The Brewers Arms
2016 Rodmell Toad Club
2017 Rodmell Toad Club
2018 Black Horse
2019 Rodmell Toad Club
2020 Hiatus, no contest held
2021 Hiatus, no contest held
2022 Black Horse

Variants in other countries

Variants of this English game are played both wider afield in Europe, for example Spain where it is known as juego de la rana,  the Basque Country where it is known as igel jokoa or the jeu de la grenouille in France. Outside Europe, it is widely played in South America where it is variously known as juego de la rana in Chile and Colombia, juego del sapo in Peru, Uruguay and Argentina, tiro al sapo in Bolivia and Peru. The game is also played in St. Louis, Missouri where it is also referred to as simply rana.

A similar American game is washer pitching.

References
 Finn, Timothy: Pub Games of England (Oleander Press)

Notes

External links
Toad in the hole in the Online guide to traditional games
 El juego de la rana (Spanish)

Pub games
Precision sports